Pesochnoye is a rural locality (a settlement) in Kubenskoye Rural Settlement, Vologodsky District, Vologda Oblast, Russia. The population was 6 as of 2002. There are 8 streets.

Geography 
Pesochnoye is located 33 km northwest of Vologda (the district's administrative centre) by road. Irkhino is the nearest rural locality.

References 

Rural localities in Vologodsky District